Thiago Ennes Moreira (born 5 March 1996 in Magé) is a Brazilian footballer who plays as right back for Campeonato Brasileiro Série B club Remo.

Career

Early career

São Bernardo
On 29 January 2019 Thiago signed with São Bernardo. At the club he played a total of five Campeonato Paulista Série A2 matches before switching clubs again.

Confiança
On 16 April 2019 Thiago signed with Confiança to play the 2019 Série C.

Career statistics
(Correct .)

Honours
Náutico
 Campeonato Pernambucano: 2018

Confiança
 Campeonato Sergipano: 2020

References

External links

1996 births
Living people
Brazilian footballers
Association football defenders
Campeonato Brasileiro Série A players
Campeonato Brasileiro Série B players
Campeonato Brasileiro Série C players
Liga Portugal 2 players
CR Flamengo footballers
C.F. União players
Cuiabá Esporte Clube players
Clube Náutico Capibaribe players
São Bernardo Futebol Clube players
Associação Desportiva Confiança players
Clube do Remo players
Brazilian expatriate footballers
Brazilian expatriate sportspeople in Portugal
Expatriate footballers in Portugal
Sportspeople from Rio de Janeiro (state)
People from Magé